The Bordeaux Bombers are an Australian Football club based in Bordeaux, France. It is the sixth club in France to play Australian rules football, after the Tasmania Montivilliers, Paris Cockerels, Strasbourg Kangaroos, Senlis Razorbacks and Saint-Estève Saints.

History

The Bordeaux Bombers were formed in November 2007 by player/coach Frédéric Zohar, who played for West Australian team Boxwood Hill Bombers in 2006 and returned to France inspired to form the Bordeaux Bombers with his two brothers. After several years playing on rugby fields with plastic side posts that would fall over, they won support from the regional government in the form of a dedicated oval.

 In 2008 the Bombers took part in their first official competition, the French Cup in Paris (3rd out of 4 teams).
 For their first year in the National French competition during the 2008/2009 season, they finish in last place behind Paris (champion), Strasbourg and Montpellier.
 4 July 2009 saw the second French National Cup being played in Saint-Médard-en-Jalles near Bordeaux on the first dedicated Australian Rule football oval in France. In total 6 teams took place in the competition (Paris Cokerels (victorious for the second consecutive year), Perpignan Tigers, Toulouse Crocodiles, Montpellier Fire Sharks and Strasbourg Kangaroos). The Bombers, after two pool matches just lost to Strasbourg and Perpignan, finishing 5th place after a victory after winning against Montpellier.
 The hosting of the second championship of France proved to be a positive move. After obtained an official home ground, the Bombers have acquired the use of changing rooms and storage rooms. The number of registered players passed 15. The National French competition began with a victory against Toulouse Crocodiles, on 14 November 2009 (156–99) in spite of not being able to field a full strength side due to absences and the injuries. The second round confirmed their progress winning against Perpignan Tigers: Bombers 19.19(133) to 9.8(62).

Match statistics
 Played 14 matches: 5 wins, 9 loss, 0 draw.
 841 points for.
 1005 points against.

Team

French National Competition 2009/2010

Placement Ladder 2009/2010

Legend :W : Won, D : Drawn, L : Lost, Pf : Points for, Pa : points against, Diff. : différence de points.

French National Competition 2008/2009

Legend : Pf : Number of points for, Pa : Number of points against, Diff. : Points difference.

French Cup results
 2008 :  3rd (Joint result with Montpellier Fire Sharks)
 2009 : 5th

Teams played & Results since 2007

Legend : P : Number of games played, W : number of games won, D : number of games drawns, L : Number of matches lost, Pf : Number of points for, Pa : Number of points against, Diff. : points difference.

See also 
 Australian rules football in France

External links
 French site about Australian Football
 BX BOMBERS

Australian rules football clubs in France
Sport in Bordeaux
2007 establishments in France
Australian rules football clubs established in 2007